United States of Mind is Covenant's fourth full-length album, released in March 2000.
Travelogue was a bonus disc for United States of Mind. The track "You Can Make Your Own Music" is a silent track, in reference to John Cage's song "4′33″". "Like Tears in Rain" was re-recorded in German and released as the single "Der Leiermann", which also included the original version.

Overview
The album's content finds the band united in a much more mainstream state of mind than any of their previous outings. For the most part, Covenant's typically harsh, staticky blasts of audio have been significantly smoothened out, flirting with the simple repetition of dance-pop on tracks with minimal lyrical content, and when present, lyrics often portray much more personal themes — with greater ambiguity — compared to the hostile manifestos of mankind's reality and the science fiction themes that pervade their earlier works. Some of the lyrics appear to be about reaching stardom, and the band even overflows with thanks to their fans on the liner notes. Sampled clips of dialogue, also usual on the early works, have been shed entirely save for the beginning of the gloom-bashing track "Humility".
The track "You can make your own music" is a reference to the John Cage track 4'33".

Track listing

Covers

In 2006 the U.S. Gothic Neo-Medieval/Neofolk band Unto Ashes covered One World One Sky on their album Songs For A Widow.
Industrial band Goteki covered Tour de Force on their Stolen Thunder One EP.

Personnel

Covenant
 Joakim Montelius – production (3–7, 10), engineering
 Clas Nachmanson
 Eskil Simonsson – vocals, production (1, 2, 8, 9), engineering, mixing

Technical personnel
 Bomb Tha' Dot – graphics
 Dirk Eusterbrock – band photos
 Egin Farcias – other photos
 Andreas Torkler – mastering

Chart positions

The single for "Der Leiermann" ranked #2 on the DAC Top 100 Singles for 2000.

References

2000 albums
Covenant (band) albums
Metropolis Records albums